Higher School Certificate may refer to:

Higher Secondary School Certificate, a certificate given after successfully completing at least twelve years of schooling in Bangladesh, India, and Pakistan
Higher School Certificate (Mauritius), a secondary school leaving qualification in Mauritius
Higher School Certificate (New South Wales), a secondary school credential in New South Wales, Australia
Higher School Certificate (England and Wales), an examination in England, Wales, and Northern Ireland, replaced by the A-level
Higher School Certificate (Victoria), a qualification awarded in Victoria, Australia until 1986

See also
Abitur, a designation used in Germany, Finland, Lithuania, and Estonia
GCE Advanced Level, or A-level
General Educational Development, tests of high school level skills in the United States and Canada
Higher (Scottish), or Highers
Matura, a secondary school exit exam in several European countries
:Category:Secondary school qualifications